Gheorghe Vitanidis (1 October 1929 – 25 November 1994) was a Romanian film director. He directed 19 films between 1958 and 1987. His 1969 film A Woman for a Season was entered into the 6th Moscow International Film Festival. His 1979 film The Moment was entered into the 11th Moscow International Film Festival.

Selected filmography
 Ciulinii Bărăganului (The Baragan Thistles, 1958)
 A Woman for a Season (1969)
 The Moment (1979)
 Burebista (1980)
 The Silver Mask (1985)

References

External links

1929 births
1994 deaths
People from Mangalia
Romanian film directors